Le Mans University (French: Le Mans Université; formerly Université du Maine) is a public university in western France with campuses in Le Mans and Laval.

It is part of the Angers-Le Mans University Community.

Composition 
In accordance with the French Education Code, which establishes the legal organization of public universities, the Le Mans University consists of several components. There are the training and research units (UFR), referred to as "faculties", and other components, referred to as "institutes and schools" . The university therefore consists of:

Training and research units 
 Faculty of Law, Economics and Management
 Faculty of Arts, Humanities and Social Sciences
 Faculty of Science and Technology

Institutes and schools 
 Laval University Institute of Technology
 University Institute of Technology of Le Mans
 National School of Engineers of Le Mans (Ensim)
 Risk and Insurance Institute, which specialiases in law, economics and mathematics.

History

Beginnings 
The university opened in 1977 as the University of Maine, named after the former Maine province of which it is a part. However, its history goes back a decade before that. In 1965, the decision was made to open a literary college on the edge of Le Mans. This college was only an annex of the University of Caen, where decisions were made jointly by the leaders of the university with the leaders of the Le Mans. The hill of Vaurouzé was chosen to host the new study center. The proximity of a few kilometers with the hospital suggests the possibility of opening a hospital one day. In 1966, the buildings of the CLOUS (Local Center for University and School Works) were built. Housing and a dining services were the only services available. A year later, the IUTs of business management, business administration and chemistry were opened. In 1968, the IUT was increased by two sections: mechanical engineering and production engineering. Cities continue to be created. In 1969, the city of Le Mans obtained total independence from the University of Caen. The university was no longer an annex, but a university centre in its own right.

In 1975, two new UFRs opened: Law and Letters.

In 2017, the university renamed itself to Le Mans University.

Creation 
Le Mans University was officially recognized by the French Ministry of Higher Education in 1977. A final science department was created, bringing the number of students to 3,000. The leaders were aware that the campus needed to develop, comparing it to the larger neighboring universities. In 1985, there was a large increase in enrollment. However, the university had a major disadvantage: the campus was too far from the city centre, and in the evening, it felt desolate, which many found distressing.

In 1987, the capacity was reached and the current amphitheatres were not enough to welcome all of the students. The Robert Garnier Amphitheater of the UFR Arts and Letters is almost entirely subsidized by the city.

In 1990, resources were given to the university to build three new buildings. This cost a total of 9 million francs at the time.

Expansion 
In 1992, the European institute of music professions decided to settle in the centre of the technopole, close to the university. The institute welcomed students from all over France and also European students for a rare and recognized training. In the same year, the CTTM: Le Mans Technology Transfer Center opened its doors. The link between the technopole and the university is began. In 1993, ISMANS, the Higher Institute of Materials of Le Mans, settled on the campus. Two amphitheatres, eight laboratories and twelve classrooms are dedicated to it. New student housing was also created.

In 1994, the vocational university opened its doors. Partnerships with neighboring companies were already in place.  The University House was also erected. It allowed for better coordination on campus. The development of the streets is revised, the science department is enlarged with 21 million francs, entirely taken over by the CUM. In the same year, the IUP micro-informatics-electronics diversified the cultural offer. In 1995, cars were considered to be too numerous on the campus: lanes reserved for buses were then fitted, with a device preventing light vehicles from using these lanes. Three lines (12, 15 and 19) serve the university. This allows the buses not to be bothered by the many cars, often parked in places that are not intended for them.

In 1997, for the twenty years of the campus, the Higher School of Geometers and topographers comes to settle in Le Mans. In 1998, the ENSIM, the National School of Engineers of Le Mans, settled down. The years 1997 to 1999 are the most successful years with about 11,000 students enrolled throughout the campus and the university is full of training. A central university library is built on two floors where the different UFRs can be referred. The scattered premises of the former BUs of the various UFRs are abandoned to make them classrooms or IBs, libraries of institutes, more sharp than the central BU.

In 2007, the Le Mans tram links the campus to the city centre in a few minutes and south of Le Mans in 25 minutes. In 2002, the technopole took on a new form, as pharmaceutical companies expanded and gained ground on the southern end of the campus. Between 2003 and 2006, the facilities were numerous, and the bet made 30 years ago, to link the university to the city was finally won. Many services were built in the image of a skating rink (City Ice), a skate park, etc. Enrollment has now returned to the 1997 level (over 10,000 students). The campus was expanding quickly with the creation of a new district and new university housing. A parking garage with three floors and a large shopping area were built. Besides the city of Laval, annexes had been created in the city of Le Mans with the "Campus-technology" district in the south of the city.

In 2009, the university became a founding member of PRES University Nantes Angers Le Mans university group.

Academics

Education 
Le Mans University offers more than 140 degrees in four areas: arts, letters, languages; Law, economics, management; Humanities and Social Sciences ; Science, technology, health. The courses are conducted by the three UFRs, two IUTs and one engineering school.

The courses of the UFR Sciences and Techniques are spread over six departments:
 The biology and geoscience departments offer a bachelor's degree in life sciences and earth sciences, a bachelor's degree in public-geomatics, a bachelor's degree in animal production, and an ecology-environment master's degree
 The chemistry department offers a degree in chemistry and chemistry
 The computer science department offers a bachelor's degree in science for the engineer, and a master computer-ISI
 The mathematics department offers a mathematical license, and a master's degree in mathematics and applications
 The Physical-Mechanical-Acoustics department offers a bachelor's degree in Engineering Sciences, a Physical-Chemistry degree with a Franco-German option and an integrated preparation for engineering school competitions, a professional license for engines and the environment, Development of competitive vehicles, professional licensing of acoustics and vibrations, a professional license for non-destructive testing, a professional license for eco-construction and energy, a master technological innovations-digital engineering in applied and mechanical physics, a physical master and an acoustic master
 The STAPS department offers a STAPS license, and a STAPS master.
The UFR's courses in humanities, languages and humanities are divided into eight departments:
 The Department of Germanic Studies offers a bachelor's degree in German Language and Literature, a master's degree in German, and a master's degree in Languages-FLE-Educational Technologies
 The Department of English Studies offers a bachelor's degree in English, a master's degree in English, a master's degree in English, a master's degree in English, a preparation for an in-house English program, and a PhD Of English
 The Spanish department offers a bachelor's degree in foreign language-literatures and civilizations, a master's degree in foreign languages and literature, and a master's degree in languages-FLE-educational technologies
 The geography department offers a geography degree, a professional license georeferenced data analysis applied to distribution and services, a research master, a professional master, a master PLC history-geography, and a doctorate geography
 The history department offers a degree in history, a professional license in the development and protection of cultural heritage, a bachelor's degree in cultural and artistic activities, a bachelor's degree in European studies, an inter-university diploma in religions and atheism in the context of secularism, Academic history and family genealogy, a research master's degree, a PE master's, a master PLC, a professional master's degree and a doctorate of history
 The department L.E.A. (Applied foreign letters) offers an English-Spanish license, an English-German license, a business license and a master's degree
 The Department of Letters offers a bachelor's degree in Modern Languages, a master's degree in Languages and Literature, a master's degree in Literature for Youth, a PE Master, a MEEF Master, a PhD in literature and a PhD in Language Science.
The courses in Law, Economics and Management are divided into two areas:
 In law, the UFR proposes a law degree, a professional license in the insurance trades, a professional license in agricultural law, a master's degree in private law and public law, a master's degree in business law and a doctorate in law
 In Economics and Management, the UFR offers a bachelor's degree in economics, a bachelor's degree in Business Engineering, a bachelor's degree in Hotel and Restaurant Management, a bachelor's degree in Business Marketing, a bachelor's degree in economics, a master's degree in economics, a Master's, And a doctorate in economics and management.
The IUT's courses are based on four departments: chemistry, mechanical and production engineering, business and government management, and physical measures.
 The IUT offers four university diplomas in technology: a DUT in chemistry, a DUT in management of companies and administrations, a DUT in mechanical and production engineering, and a DUT in physical measurements
 It also offers nine professional licenses: commercialization of banking and insurance products, professional mobility-management of training and skills, business management analysis, accounting and payroll management, portfolio manager Customer in expertise, computer-aided design and manufacturing, materials science and mechanics design and industrialization, chemical analysis and materials control, fine chemistry and synthesis
 Finally, the IUT offers a university degree: preparation for scientific and technological training.
The IUT de Laval's courses are organized around four themes:
 WEB and multimedia creation with: a DUT professions of multimedia and Internet, and a professional license design and realization of services and multimedia products
 Biology and laboratory with: a DUT biological engineering, and a professional license hygiene and safety of agri-food production
 Computer science and programming with: a DUT computer, and a professional license test and quality software
 Trade and marketing with: a DUT marketing techniques, a professional license trade manager import / export, and a professional license in agrofood trade and agrofourniture.
The ENSIM School of Engineering courses are divided into two specialties and four options:
 The specialty vibration, acoustics, sensors offers options: vibration and acoustics, and systems and methods for measurement and instrumentation
 The computer specialty offers the options: architecture of real and embedded systems, and interaction systems.

Campus and student life 
The university's campuses are both located on spacious plots of land on the outskirts of Laval and Le Mans.

The university has CROUS residence halls and dining services available to students on both campuses.

Le Mans University has several student organisations and sports clubs available to students.

Notable people

Faculty
 Guy Pedroncini (1924-2006) - military historian
 Élisabeth Du Réau (1937-2021) - historian
 Gérard Férey (1941, in Bréhal – 2017) - chemist
 Nicole El Karoui (born 1944, in Paris) - mathematician, pioneer in the development of mathematical finance
 Antoine Compagnon (born 1950 in Brussels, Belgium) - specialist in French literature 
 Sylvie Granger (1955, Lyon – 2022) - modernist historian. 
 Sylvie Faucheux  (born 1960, in Paris) - specialist in the economy of the natural environment and sustainable development; university president
 Dominique Avon (born 1968, in Ghent) - historian of religion

Alumni
 Gilbert Paquette (born 1942, in Montreal) - computer scientist 
 Bertrand Lançon (born 1952, Le Mans) - historian and novelist, a specialist of late Antiquity
 Jean-Carles Grelier (born 1966, Le Mans) - politician of The Republicans (LR) 
 Marc Joulaud (born 1967, in Mayenne) - politician, MEP
 François Fillon (born 1954, Le Mans) - Prime Minister
 Sébastien Bourdais (born 1979, Le Mans) - race car driver
  - Chief Justice of the Court of Cassation

See also
 List of public universities in France by academy

References

Educational institutions established in 1977
Universities and colleges in Le Mans
Universities in Pays de la Loire
1977 establishments in France